Jenni Calder (née Daiches) (born 1941) is a Scottish literary historian, and arts establishment figure.  

Edinburgh based, she has been part of the Scottish literary community for many years. Her teaching and writing cover Scottish, English and American literary and historical subjects. 

She has written 28 books on literary and historical subjects, including biographies of Walter Scott, Robert Louis Stevenson, George Orwell  and Naomi Mitchison and  books on Scottish history and Scottish emigration. She has a particular research interest in emigration and the Scottish diaspora.   She worked at the National Museums of Scotland from 1978 to 2001 and latterly as Head of Museum of Scotland International. In 2003 she helped to organise the National Museums of Scotland's exhibition called 'Trailblazers - the Scots in Canada'. She was president of Scottish PEN, a not-for-profit organisation that champions freedom of expression and literature across borders. 

She writes fiction and poetry as Jenni Daiches. 

She was formerly married to Angus Calder, and is the daughter of David Daiches  a prominent Scottish, Jewish, writer, critic and historian. She was born in the US and spent time in Kenya. Her book Not Nebuchadnezzar is a partly a biography and a 'chronicle of the consuming search for that elusive concept known as 'identity''. She has spoken out about anti-antisemitism   

On the question of Scottish independence; of 27 Scottish authors whose opinion was sought, Calder was one of only two offering a definite No.

Some works

There Must Be a Lone Ranger: The myth and reality of the American Wild West. Hamish Hamilton, 1974
Huxley Brave New World and Orwell Nineteen Eighty Four. Edward Arnold, 1976

Stevenson and Victorian Scotland. Edinburgh University Press, 1984
Animal Farm and Nineteen Eighty Four. Open University, 1988
The Wealth of a Nation. Publications Office, Edinburgh, 1989
Scotland in Trust: The National Trust for Scotland, 1990

The Story of the Scottish Soldier, 1600-1914. National Museums of Scotland, 1992
Enterprising Scot: Scottish Adventure and Achievement. National Museums of Scotland, 1995

Scots in the USA. Luath Press, 2006

Reviews
 Clunas, Alexander (1982), review of Stevenson and Victorian Scotland, in Murray, Glen (ed.), Cencrastus No. 8, Spring 1982, pp. 42 & 42,

References

Living people
1941 births
Alumni of New Hall, Cambridge
Jenni
Jewish historians
Scottish literary historians
Scottish Jewish writers
Scottish Jews
British women historians
20th-century Scottish historians
21st-century Scottish historians
21st-century Scottish women writers
20th-century Scottish women writers
Women literary historians

Scottish poets